Road signs in Sweden are regulated in Vägmärkesförordningen, VMF (2007:90), and are to be placed 2 metres from the road with the sign 1.6 m from the base for motorized roads. Except for route numbers, there are a maximum of three signs on a pole, with the most important sign at the top. All signs have a reflective layer added on selected parts of the sign as is custom in European countries; most larger signs also have their own illumination.

Most signs are based on pictograms, with some exceptions like the prohibition-sign for stop at customs and signal and speed limit signs.
If the sign includes text, the text is written in Swedish, except the stop sign, which is written in English ("STOP").

Swedish road signs depict people with realistic (as opposed to stylized) silhouettes.

Major differences between Swedish and general European signs
Like other countries in Europe, Swedish signs follow the Vienna Convention on Road Signs and Signals.
Whereas European signs usually have white background on warning and prohibition signs, the Swedish signs have a yellow/orange colour. This is for the purpose of enhancing the visibility of the sign during the winter, as white signs would be hard to see in the snow. The prohibition signs have a red line across them if there is a symbol on them, not if it is a numeric value. General European prohibition signs do not usually have such a red line. Swedish warning and prohibition signs also have a thicker border than their European counterparts. Traffic signs in Slovenia and Finland are quite similar.

History
Around 1930 some warning signs and prohibitory signs looking like today's signs with yellow background were introduced. The direction indication signs were however yellow with black text. Around 1965, there was a reform where the colour of those were changed to dark blue with white text. Around 1980, Sweden followed the Vienna convention rule that motorways should have a different colour, so green was introduced for them, and medium blue for ordinary roads.

Private road direction sign

The reason there is a sign indicating private road, is because they are not strictly private. A private road is a road that is not maintained by the state or municipality, but by a private person or association. An owner of a private road in Sweden can prohibit cars (but not people) from using the road. But if the state pays support for the maintenance, cars can't be prohibited. This is mostly the case if several families live along the road. Then they must form an association for it. The Swedish word for this kind of road is "enskild", that can be both translated to "private" and "individual". The background of the sign is yellow, indicating that the quality is often less good, and warning signs might be missing. Signs indicating roads owned by companies or leading to companies usually have white background instead.

Warning signs
Warning signs are triangular and have red borders, but in contrast with those of most other countries that use triangular warning signs, Swedish signs have yellow backgrounds, rather than white. More types of warning signs for animals are used than in most European countries, such as moose, deer, wild boar, reindeer, sheep, horse, and cow appearing alongside roads.

Priority signs
The pedestrian and bicycle crossing signs are priority signs in Sweden, whereas the pedestrian crossing sign is regarded as a  special regulation sign in the Vienna convention on road signs and signals. A sign for bicycle crossing is not yet implemented in the Vienna convention.

Prohibitory signs
Prohibitory signs are round with yellow backgrounds and red borders, except the international standard stop sign that is an octagon with red background and white border and the no parking and no standing signs that have a blue background instead of yellow.

Stop at customs
The sign "Stop at customs" ("Stopp vid tull") is multilingual and exists in four variants.

Mandatory signs
Mandatory signs are always round blue signs with white border.

Special regulation signs

Signs giving information

Other signs

Additional panels

A Supreme Court case has clarified that if there are multiple individually framed additional panels for a road sign, they add information to the road sign, not to each other. The two panels in the case was Avgift (fee) and the other 4 hours 9-18, which means that there is mandatory fee anytime and maximum 4 hours 9 am-6 pm.

Traffic light signals
Note: tip-down triangles indicates blinking/flashing light.

Road markings

Signals by police officers

Retired signs

References

External links
 Swedish Transport Agency

Sweden
Signs
Traffic signals
Driving in Sweden